Pirate Express is an animated series produced by Atomic Cartoons and Sticky Pictures. The show consists of 26 episodes, all of which aired during a single week in April 2015 on Teletoon. It has not aired on the channel since its premiere week. In Australia, the series debuted on 9Go! on July 4, 2015.

Synopsis
300 years ago, Captain LaPoutine and his crew, Armando, Burt, Booli and Spewey tried to steal a princess' tiara, but unfortunately they accidentally stole Poseidon's underwear instead. This angered Poseidon and made him shrink the pirates and imprison them in a bottle. In the present day, The pirates were accidentally released by his younger son, Newt. So Newt decided to take control of the pirates and go on adventures with them.

Cast
James Higuchi as Newt
Lee Tockar as Captain LaPoutine
Alessandro Juliani as Armando
Matt Cowlrick as Burt
Doron Bell as Booli
Ian Corlett as Poseidon, Gordon
Dee Jay Jackson as Zeus
Garry Chalk as Ted
Kelly Sheridan as Marie Celeste

Production

Pirate Express was picked up for development by Teletoon in 2011. Originally, the show was set to be a Canada-France co-production between Atomic Cartoons and Ellipsanime, with episodes expected to be finished by March 2012. In July 2013, the series was officially greenlit for production, but with Australia's Sticky Pictures replacing Ellipsanime as a co-production partner. It was then set for a fall 2014 debut on Teletoon and Nine Network in Australia. Ultimately, the show would launch in both markets in 2015.

Episodes

International broadcast

In the United Kingdom, the series aired on Kix. In South East Asia, Pirate Express debuted on Disney XD on September 5, 2015. In the United States, the series is currently available on Tubi and Peacock as of February 2022.

References

External links

2015 Canadian television series debuts
2015 Canadian television series endings
2015 Australian television series debuts
2016 Australian television series endings
2010s Canadian animated television series
2010s Australian animated television series
Australian children's animated action television series
Australian children's animated adventure television series
Australian children's animated comedy television series
Australian children's animated fantasy television series
Canadian children's animated action television series
Canadian children's animated adventure television series
Canadian children's animated comedy television series
Canadian children's animated fantasy television series
English-language television shows
9Go! original programming
Teletoon original programming
Television series based on classical mythology
Television series set in ancient Greece
Australian flash animated television series
Canadian flash animated television series
Television series about pirates